A Linear diode array is used for digitizing x-ray images.  The LDA system consists of an array of photodiode modules,  The diodes are laminated with a scintillation screen to create x-ray sensitive diodes. The scintillation screen converts the photon energy emitted by the x-ray tube into visible light on the diodes. The diodes produce a voltage when the light energy is received.  This voltage is amplified, multiplexed, and converted to a digital signal.

Use
One of the unique characteristics of the LDA is that it has an excellent dynamic range.  This means that it is capable of generating useful data when x-raying both very thick (tread) and thin (sidewall) sections of a tire simultaneously.  However, the human eye is capable of visualizing only a small fraction of the LDA's full dynamic range.  To compensate for the limitations of the human eye while still taking advantage of this feature of the LDA, a variety of selectable contrast and brightness enhancing tables are available.

X-ray instrumentation
Optical diodes